William Alan Masters (born 1961) is an American economist, teaching and conducting research on agricultural economics and food policy in the Friedman School of Nutrition at Tufts University, where he also has a secondary appointment in the Department of Economics.

Education 
William A. Masters was educated in the U.S. and France then attended Deep Springs College (1979-81) before transferring to Yale University for a BA (1984) in Economics & Political Science. He received his PhD (1991) in Applied Economics from Stanford University, through the Food Research Institute.

Career 
He served as a Research Associate and Lecturer at the University of Zimbabwe (1989-90), and then was a faculty member in Agricultural Economics at Purdue University (1991-2010), with leave years at the Harvard Kennedy School of Government (2000) and the Earth Institute at Columbia University (2003-04). He served as co-editor of the journal Agricultural Economics from 2006 to 2011, and moved to Tufts in 2010 where he served as chair of the Department of Food and Nutrition Policy from 2011 to 2014.

Awards
In 2020 he was elected a Fellow of the Agricultural & Applied Economics Association (AAEA), from which he has also received the Bruce Gardner Memorial Prize for Applied Policy Analysis (2013) for work on pay-for-performance contributing to the World Bank's AgResults program, the Publication of Enduring Quality Award (2014) for work on climatic factors in economic growth, the Quality of Research Discovery Award (2019) for work on caregiver incentives in child nutrition, and the Quality of Communications Award (2022) for work on cost and affordability of nutritious diets. He is also an International Fellow of the African Association of Agricultural Economists (2010), and as a student he was supported by a Harry S. Truman Scholarship (1981), a Fulbright Dissertation Research Grant (1988) among other awards.

Research and teaching
His dissertation was based on leading two years of farm household surveys in Zimbabwe linked to data on international trade and market prices, and was published as a book entitled Government and Agriculture in Zimbabwe. While on the faculty at Purdue University he conducted fieldwork and teaching in Southern, Eastern and Western Africa, including early use of climate data to identify the role of winter frosts in economic development.  After moving to Tufts in 2010 he focused on the economics of nutrition, including pioneering work on caregiver incentives, on the composition of infant foods, and on the development of new price indexes for food as an input to human health.  His Food Prices for Nutrition project created new estimates for the cost and affordability of healthy diets used by the FAO, other UN agencies and the World Bank. He is also co-author of a textbook entitled Economics of Agricultural Development: World Food Systems and Resource Use (4th edition, 2021).

References

Stanford University alumni
Deep Springs College alumni
Tufts University faculty
Agricultural economists
1961 births
Living people